is an incorporated town in Marin County, California, United States. The town is bordered by San Rafael to the east, Fairfax to the west, and Ross to the south. Mount Tamalpais dominates the view to the south. The population was 12,830 at the 2020 census.

History

Early history 
The land in and around San Anselmo was mostly pastoral until 1874, when the North Pacific Coast Railroad (NPC) added to its line a spur track from San Anselmo to San Rafael. In 1875, the railroad completed a line from Sausalito to Tomales and north to Cazadero via San Anselmo.  For a few years, the town was referred to on railroad maps as "Junction", but in 1883 the name San Anselmo came back into use. The San Anselmo post office opened in 1892. Two postal substations were operated: Lansdale, from 1924 to 1962, and Yolanda, from 1924 to 1954.

From 1902 until the early 1940s, San Anselmo was part of Marin's Northwestern Pacific (in 1907, investors formed the NWP) Electric Train system.  The Miracle Mile's and Center Boulevard's current "raised roadbed" were the railroad's right of way.
Becoming unprofitable as a result of competition from the automobile and the opening of the Golden Gate Bridge, the railway was officially closed on March 1, 1941. The last of the major San Anselmo railroad station buildings was razed in 1963, according to the town's timeline.

The 1913 electric train schedule shows a commute time from San Anselmo to the Sausalito Ferry to the Ferry Building in San Francisco of a mere 58 minutes, including the 32-minute ferry transit.

San Anselmo incorporated on April 9, 1907. Its name came from the Punta de Quintin land grant, which marked the valley as the Canada del Anselmo, or Valley of Anselm, Anselm being the name of a Native American who was buried in the area. San Anselmo was a silent film capital in the early 1900s.

World War II

Sleepy Hollow ammunition storage 
During World War II, the Army based a small ammunition storage dump, known as ASP #2, about  up Butterfield Road from Sir Francis Drake Blvd. The facility was located between the road and San Anselmo Creek and had 23 to 45 men stationed there.
There were two batteries composed of four-inch antiaircraft cannon manned by five soldiers on a 24-hour basis. One battery was on Stuyvesant Drive and the other on Oak Springs Hill.
During the war, the Sleepy Hollow Country Club, located in the old Hotaling mansion, was still open and provided a pleasant break from "grueling" guard duty, according to those stationed at the ammo dump.

Air raid wardens
During World War II, air raid wardens, like Zinnia and Alfred Heiden of San Francisco Blvd., patrolled their assigned neighborhood during nighttime air raid drills to notify neighbors of any light that showed out of their houses. Windows were covered with cloth or thick paper during the war to deny enemy bombers illuminated nighttime bombing targets.

Pilot training accidents
In the late afternoon of November 2, 1941, five weeks before the US entered the war, San Anselmo residents were startled when two low-flying Curtiss P-40 warplanes roared up the valley at just above roof level and crashed into the east side of Bald Hill (often incorrectly reported as Mount Baldy or Bald Mountain) at 5:40pm.

Element leader Lt. Thomas "Bud" L. Truax and Lt. Russell E. Speckman were killed when their planes crashed, in low visibility, into Bald Hill, just shy of the peak. It was almost dark, was misty and they were under a low cloud ceiling. They were critically low on fuel and part of a larger training group that had gotten separated. They were under the wintertime marine layer of low clouds that are common in the Marin County area, searching for nearby Hamilton Field to land. Truax Field / Dane County Regional Airport, located in Madison, WI was named in memory of Lt. Truax.

A third pilot, Lt. Walter V. "Ramblin" Radovich, had left the formation over San Rafael, almost hit the city courthouse on 4th Street, circled the Forbes Hill radio beacon (37°58'44.73"N,122°32'50.78"W), clipped a tree and then turned northeast, towards Hamilton Field. According to USAAF accident reports, his left leg was broken when exiting the plane and he parachuted down, landing near Hwy 101 in Lucas Valley, reportedly near where Fireman's Fund / Marin Commons is currently located (38° 1'10.66"N, 122°32'29.36"W). Ironically, after Lt. Radovich bailed out, the airplane slowly descended back down through the clouds and made a relatively smooth "gear-up" landing.

Post-WWII 
On March 12, 1974, San Anselmo officially became a town. In 1963, a cast iron statue of a deer affectionately known as "Sugarfoot" by locals was donated to the town by Joeseph Dondero. This statue still stands today and children enjoy riding on his back after trips to the library next door.

The town features in the song "Snow in San Anselmo" by Irish-born singer/songwriter Van Morrison, about an unusual bout of winter weather that occurred when he was living in Fairfax, near San Anselmo, in the 1970s.

San Anselmo's most prominent resident, movie director George Lucas, used some of the proceeds from his film American Graffiti to buy an old Victorian house in San Anselmo; his then-wife Marcia Lucas named it "Parkhouse."  Lucas worked on his Star Wars script for two and a half years, writing much of it at the back of his San Anselmo house in a room he shared with a gaudy Wurlitzer jukebox. In 1977, Lucas screened an early version of Star Wars, without completed special effects, at his San Anselmo home for a small group of Hollywood friends, including the producer Alan Ladd, Jr., directors Steven Spielberg, Brian DePalma, and Martin Scorsese, and screenwriters Jay Cocks, Willard Huyck, and Gloria Katz.

Geography

All but a sliver of San Anselmo lies within the  Ross Valley Watershed that flows into San Francisco Bay. The principal waterway of the town's portion of the watershed is San Anselmo Creek, a branch of Corte Madera Creek. Two of San Anselmo Creek's tributaries, Sleepy Hollow Creek and Sorich Creek, also flow through the town, as do East Fork Creek and West Fork Creek, Sorich Creek's two tributaries.

There are three main roads running through San Anselmo. Their junction is known locally as the Hub, which lies near the central business district. Sir Francis Drake Boulevard runs north from Ross, turns north-west at the Hub, and then proceeds west to Fairfax.  Red Hill Avenue (also called "The Miracle Mile") runs west from San Rafael, after 4th Street and 3rd Street merge, and into the Hub where it becomes Center Boulevard. Center Boulevard runs northwest from the Hub to Fairfax and Sir Francis Drake parallels Center Boulevard to Fairfax, offset to the north.

The town's natural skyline is dominated by the hills of Ross Valley.  To the north are Red Hill and Grove Hill.  To the southwest is Bald Hill.  To the east is Moore Hill. In the distance to the south is Mount Tamalpais.

A large part of southern and western San Anselmo is built on a natural floodplain. About every 15–23 years, heavy rains cause San Anselmo Creek to flood the center of town by up to 4 feet - 1925, 1940 (11.38" rainfall in 3 days), 1963, January 1982, as well as December 30/31, 2005. The worst flood, on Jan 2, 1982, (the highest creek water level, according to interviews with longtime creek-side residents) was preceded by a rainfall amount that exceeded 8" in 12 hours.

San Anselmo's historic raised railroad bed (now Center Boulevard), acts as a dike, providing some flood protection to the west-side houses, upstream of the business district.

A number of homes on the floodplain (called the "Flatlands" by the Town) as far back as at least 1920, have been built with raised foundations to accommodate the minor periodic floods.

Most of the downtown antique and boutique stores and restaurants, for which San Anselmo is well known, are along the banks of San Anselmo Creek.

Demographics

2010
At the 2010 census San Anselmo had a population of 12,336. The racial makeup of San Anselmo was 11,134 (90.3%) White, 106 (0.9%) African American, 40 (0.3%) Native American, 437 (3.5%) Asian, 26 (0.2%) Pacific Islander, 164 (1.3%) from other races, and 429 (3.5%) from two or more races. Hispanic or Latino of any race were 717 people (5.8%).

The census reported that 99.6% of the population lived in households and 0.4% lived in non-institutionalized group quarters.

There were 5,243 households, 1,695 (32.3%) had children under the age of 18 living in them, 2,607 (49.7%) were opposite-sex married couples living together, 471 (9.0%) had a female householder with no husband present, 173 (3.3%) had a male householder with no wife present.  There were 273 (5.2%) unmarried opposite-sex partnerships, and 66 (1.3%) same-sex married couples or partnerships. 1,564 households (29.8%) were one person and 484 (9.2%) had someone living alone who was 65 or older. The average household size was 2.34. There were 3,251 families (62.0% of households); the average family size was 2.93.

The age distribution was 2,879 people (23.3%) under the age of 18, 500 people (4.1%) aged 18 to 24, 2,804 people (22.7%) aged 25 to 44, 4,492 people (36.4%) aged 45 to 64, and 1,661 people (13.5%) who were 65 or older.  The median age was 44.9 years. For every 100 females, there were 87.4 males.  For every 100 females age 18 and over, there were 85.6 males.

There were 5,538 housing units at an average density of 2,068.6 per square mile, of the occupied units 3,484 (66.5%) were owner-occupied and 1,759 (33.5%) were rented. The homeowner vacancy rate was 1.2%; the rental vacancy rate was 4.5%.  8,849 people (71.7% of the population) lived in owner-occupied housing units and 3,434 people (27.8%) lived in rental housing units.

2000
At the 2000 census there were 12,378 people in 5,267 households, including 3,191 families, in the town. The racial makeup of the town in 2010 was 86.4% non-Hispanic White, 0.8% non-Hispanic African American, 0.2% Native American, 3.5% Asian, 0.2% Pacific Islander, 0.3% from other races, and 2.7% from two or more races. Hispanic or Latino of any race were 5.8%.

Of the 5,267 households 30.2% had children under the age of 18 living with them, 48.5% were married couples living together, 8.7% had a female householder with no husband present, and 39.4% were non-families. 28.7% of households were one person and 7.3% were one person aged 65 or older. The average household size was 2.30 and the average family size was 2.84.

The age distribution was 21.8% under the age of 18, 4.4% from 18 to 24, 31.4% from 25 to 44, 31.1% from 45 to 64, and 11.3% 65 or older. The median age was 41 years. For every 100 females, there were 89.2 males. For every 100 females age 18 and over, there were 85.4 males.

The median income for a household in the town was $71,488, and the median family income was $86,528. Males had a median income of $61,172 versus $47,170 for females. The per capita income for the town was $41,977. About 2.5% of families and 5.1% of the population were below the poverty line, including 1.7% of those under age 18 and 3.1% of those age 65 or over.

Government and politics

San Anselmo has a council–manager form of government, in which an elected town council creates policy and hires a town manager to implement the policy.  The five-member town council is elected by the voters at large.  The posts of mayor and vice-mayor rotate among the council.  San Anselmo's current mayor is Brian Colbert and the Town Manager is David P. Donery.

The town of San Anselmo is the second-most Democratic political subdivision in Marin County (behind only Fairfax). According to the Secretary of State of California, as of October 22, 2012, San Anselmo has 8,622 registered voters. Of those, 5,361 (62.2%) are registered Democrats, 994 (11.5%) are registered Republicans, 1,806 (21.0%) decline to state a political party, and 461 are registered with other parties.

Since 2013 police services have been provided by the Central Marin Police Authority, which also polices the nearby towns of Corte Madera, Larkspur, and portions of Greenbrae.

Federal and state representation
From 2008 to 2012, Huffman represented Marin County in the California State Assembly.

In the California State Legislature, San Anselmo is in:
  
  .

Presidential election results

San Anselmo is an overwhelmingly Democratic city in presidential elections. In 2012, Barack Obama received 83.10% of the vote, and in 2016, Hillary Clinton received 85.43% of the vote.

Notable people

 Dave Anthony (born 1967), American comedian, actor, screenwriter, and podcaster.
 Arj Barker (born 1974), American stand-up comedian, attended Sir Francis Drake High School.
 John Boccabella (born 1941), former Major League Baseball player
 Terry Bozzio (born 1950) drummer, percussionist, and vocalist with Frank Zappa and founder of the new wave group  Missing Persons.
 Gary Fisher (born 1950), inventor of the mountain bike, opened his first store, MountainBikes, in San Anselmo.
 Dana Gilbert (born 1959), tennis player
 Jane Levy (born in Los Angeles 1989), actress, raised in San Anselmo 
 George Lucas (born in Modesto 1944), film director, screenwriter, producer, and entrepreneur
 Don Novello (Fairfax 1943), comedian
 Mary Ann Shaffer (1934–2008), American writer, lived and died in San Anselmo
 Neal Schon, guitarist of rock band Journey
Michael Schwab (designer) (born 1952), American graphic designer and illustrator, his design studio is in San Anselmo.
Scott Thunes (born 1960) bass guitarist with Frank Zappa, Wayne Kramer, Steve Vai, Andy Prieboy, Mike Keneally, Fear, The Waterboys, Big Bang Beat, and others. Raised in San Anselmo.

Schools
San Anselmo is home to a variety of schools:
 Brookside Elementary School of the Ross Valley School District, grades K-5
 Hidden Valley Elementary School, Ross Valley School District, grades K-5
 Wade Thomas Elementary School, Ross Valley School District, grades K-5
 White Hill Middle School, Ross Valley School District, grades 6-8
 Saint Anselm's Catholic School, a private school founded in 1924 by the Catholic Church; grades K-8
 San Domenico School, co-ed pre-kindergarten through 12th
 Archie Williams High School, Tamalpais Union High School District, grades 9-12
 San Francisco Theological Seminary, a part of the Presbyterian Church (USA) system of seminaries
 Stapleton School of the Performing Arts

Notes

External links

 
 San Anselmo Chamber of Commerce
 San Anselmo Historical Museum

 
Cities in Marin County, California
Cities in the San Francisco Bay Area
Incorporated cities and towns in California
1907 establishments in California
Populated places established in 1907